Pranjal Banerjee is an Indian professional football referee who officiates primarily the matches of both I-League and Indian Super League.

Banerjee was awarded 2016 All India Football Federation Referee of the Year.

References 

wrong decision maker

External links 
All India Football Federation referee Pranjal Banerjee
WorldReferee

Indian football referees
1986 births
Living people